Gadis River (means: Virgin River) is a river in northern Sumatra, Indonesia.

Geography 
The river flows along the northwest area of Sumatra with predominantly tropical rainforest climate (designated as Af in the Köppen-Geiger climate classification). The annual average temperature in the area is 25 °C. The warmest month is March, when the average temperature is around 26 °C, and the coldest is January, at 23 °C. The average annual rainfall is 3953 mm. The wettest month is November, with an average of 588 mm rainfall, and the driest is June, with 175 mm rainfall.

See also
List of rivers of Indonesia
List of rivers in Sumatra

References

Rivers of North Sumatra
Rivers of Indonesia